Tacoma School District No. 10, commonly called Tacoma Public Schools, is a school district headquartered in Tacoma, Washington, United States. Composed of 35 elementary schools, 11 middle schools, 10 high schools, and 4 early learning centers. It is the third largest school district in Washington State. Tacoma Public Schools serve more than 30,000 students PK-12 and nearly 5,000 employees, making it one of the largest employers in the greater Tacoma area.

History

In the decades preceding World War I, Tacoma Public Schools, like much of the United States, were largely influenced by a new influx of European immigrants that had been creating challenges among both governmental and religious agencies in devising a plan for best addressing ethnic integration. Many immigrant families, primarily from eastern and southern European descent, were of rural backgrounds and struggled to adapt to a more urban and advanced way of life. In 1913, the National Conference on Immigration and Americanization developed a list of three essential aspects of immigrant assimilation: literacy, health and hygiene, and the learning of democracy. As a result, schools across the nation began introducing new policies and programs that were intended to promote and teach the importance of these three values.

Closely following national trends, the Tacoma School District began widespread incorporation of nurses, health clinics, showers, and home economic departments, all of which were designed to improve health and hygiene within school property. Tacoma Public Schools also witnessed a significant expansion in social services, including after-school programs, summer school, and availability of on-site lunches. This focus on the civic responsibilities of schools resulted in the improvement of libraries, lunchrooms, administrative offices, and other rooms designated towards providing the necessary space and tools that address new communal values and concerns.

United States involvement in World War I had a significant effect on the demographics of both Tacoma and its school system. The 1914 opening of the Panama Canal, and the 1917 establishment of Fort Lewis (Now Joint Base Lewis-McChord) resulted in a significant population increase in Tacoma and its surrounding areas. The Panama Canal succeeded in expanding business and industry associated with the Port of Tacoma, while Fort Lewis quickly became the largest in the United States at the time, consisting of 37,000 soldiers. From 1915 to 1920, enrollment in Tacoma Public Schools had risen from 14,211 to 18,023 (a 22% increase).  To address the rapid growth of student population, the district school board debated between three possible educational models, all of which would have an effect on the future construction of schools. The models included the 8-4 system, the 6-6 system, and the 6-3-3 system. The 8-4 system, which was the typical model for schools prior to World War I, had grades one through eight in elementary schools with grades nine through 12 in high schools. The proposed 6-6 system advocated for grades one through six in elementary school, with grades seven through 12 in high school. The 6-3-3 system, which was eventually adopted, advocated for grades one through six in elementary school, grades seven through nine in middle school, and grades 10 through 12 in high school.

Promoting the transition to this new elementary, intermediate, high school model, Tacoma voters authorized a $2.4 million plan in 1923, which jump-started construction of six new intermediate schools and additions to several existing elementary schools. Jason Lee was the first intermediate school to be constructed, soon followed by James P. Stewart and Morton M. McCarver middle schools. Franklin B. Gault, Allan C. Mason, and Robert Gray middle schools were the last constructed, and all opened on the same day the following year.

The onset of World War II resulted in another significant population spike within Tacoma and its schools, as both the Port of Tacoma and Fort Lewis boomed with similar economic prowess as seen previously in World War I. From 1950 to 1956, public school enrollment shot from 22,157 to 29,778, illustrating a 26% increase. The overcrowding of aging elementary schools and need for construction in suburban areas prompted the school board to draft a new building campaign, which emphasized quick, cheap, and flexible school construction.

Boundary
The district includes almost all of Tacoma, Browns Point, Dash Point, Ruston, most of Fircrest, plus portions of Lakewood, Midland, and University Place.

List of schools

Elementary schools 

Arlington Elementary School
Birney Elementary School
Blix Elementary School
Boze Elementary School
Browns Point Elementary School
Bryan Montessori (PK-8)
Crescent Heights Elementary School
DeLong Elementary School
Downing Elementary School
Edison Elementary School
Fawcett Elementary School
Fern Hill Elementary School
Franklin Elementary School
Geiger Montessori School
Grant Center for the Expressive Arts
Jefferson Elementary School
Larchmont Elementary School
Lister Elementary School
Lowell Elementary School
Mary Lyon Elementary School
Manitou Park Elementary School
Mann Elementary School
McCarver Elementary School
Northeast Tacoma Elementary School
Point Defiance Elementary School
Jennie Reed Elementary School
Roosevelt Elementary School
Sheridan Elementary School
Sherman Elementary School
Skyline Elementary School
Stafford Elementary School
Stanley Elementary School
Washington/Hoyt Elementary School
Whitman Elementary School

Middle schools 
Baker Middle School
First Creek Middle School
Giaudrone Middle School
Gray Middle School
Jason Lee Middle School
Mason Middle School
Meeker Middle School
Stewart Middle School
Truman Middle School
Wainwright Intermediate School
Hunt Middle School
Bryant Middle School
Wainwright Middle School
Stewart Middle School
Hilltop Heritage Middle School

High schools

District Facts

Demographics

Funding